Aleš Svoboda (2 April 1941 in Zlín – 9 January 2010 in Opava) was a Czech linguist, university professor, and a prominent representative of the Prague School of linguistics.

Biography
He initially studied music and clarinet at Brno conservatoire, but later his keen interest in languages brought him to study English, German and Czech at the Faculty of Arts of Masaryk University. In 1970 he became an Assistant Professor of the Department of English and American Studies at the faculty. He was promoted to the rank of Associate Professor at Charles University in Prague in 1981 and to Full Professor at Masaryk University in Brno in 1992. Apart from Masaryk University in Brno, he also taught at Silesian University in Opava and at the University of Ostrava (both in the Czech Republic), and at University of Prešov (Slovakia).

He was a disciple and close collaborator of Professor Jan Firbas and together with him a lead investigator of a theory of Information Structure of language called Functional Sentence Perspective (FSP), inspired by the work of Vilém Mathesius. He wrote many papers on the topic, two monographs and 50 encyclopedic entries describing FSP. His most important contribution to the development of the theory of Functional Sentence Perspective was its application to the subclausal level.

See also
 Functional sentence perspective
 Topic-comment
 Vilém Mathesius

Notes

References 
 Černý, M: “In Memory of Professor Aleš Svoboda”, Topics in Linguistics 4, 2009, p. 4. Available from World Wide Web: https://web.archive.org/web/20120616235657/http://www.kaa.ff.ukf.sk/topics/issue4.pdf
 Drápela, M.: “Bibliography of Professor Aleš Svoboda”, philologica.net [online], 2014-01-13 [cited 2014-01-15]. Available from World Wide Web: http://philologica.net/studia/20140113000001.htm
 Kavka, S. J.: “Foreword” IN M. Černý, J. Chamonikolasová, S. J. Kavka and E. Klímová (Eds.): New Chapters in Functional Syntax, Ostrava: University of Ostrava, 2011, pp. 7–8

Linguists from the Czech Republic
1941 births
2010 deaths
Masaryk University alumni